Dismorphia astyocha is a butterfly in the  family Pieridae. It is found in Brazil (Rio de Janeiro) and Argentina.

References

Dismorphiinae
Butterflies described in 1831
Fauna of Brazil
Pieridae of South America